George C. Wolfe is an American director, and producer of film and television.

Over his career he has been nominated for fifteen Tony Awards, ten of those nominations being for Director of a Play or Musical. He has received three Tony Awards for Angels in America: Millennium Approaches in 1993, Bring in 'da Noise, Bring in 'da Funk in 1996 and Elaine Stritch at Liberty in 2002. For his work in theatre he has also received three Drama Desk Awards, two Obie Awards, a Drama League Award, and a Outer Critics Circle Award, and a Lucille Lortel Award. For his work in film and television he received a Directors Guild of America Award for Outstanding Directing – Miniseries or TV Film for Lackawanna Blues in 2005. He also has been nominated for a Primetime Emmy Award, a Writers Guild of America Award and an Independent Spirit Award.

Major associations

Tony Awards

Emmy Award

Industry awards

Directors Guild of America Award

Writers Guild of America Awards

Independent Spirit Awards

Theatre awards

Drama Desk Awards

Drama League Award

Lucille Lortel Awards

Obie Award

Outer Critics Circle Awards

Miscellaneous awards

Black Reel Awards

NAACP Image Awards

References 

20th-century American dramatists and playwrights
Lists of awards received by film director